Alberto Cambrosio is a sociologist of biomedicine at McGill University. He earned his PhD in History and Sociology of Science from the Université de Montréal. He holds a bachelor's degree in Biology from the University of Basel, Switzerland, and a master's degree in Environmental Science from the Université de Sherbrooke, Canada.

He is widely published, and has written three books. In 2005, he received the Ludwik Fleck Prize from the Society for Social Studies of Science for his book Biomedical Platforms with historian Peter Keating.

He is Professor and former Chair of the Department of Social Studies of Medicine at McGill University. Since 2011 he has been a guest professor at the Center for the Sociology of Organizations in Paris, France.

References 

 Alberto Cambrosio and Peter Keating. Cancer on Trial: Oncology as a New Style of Practice, The University of Chicago Press, 2012 
 Alberto Cambrosio and Peter Keating. Biomedical Platforms. Realigning the Normal and the Pathological in Late-Twentieth-Century Medicine, MIT Press, 2003 (paperback edition: 2006) 
 Alberto Cambrosio and Peter Keating. Exquisite Specificity. The Monoclonal Antibody Revolution,  Oxford University Press, 1995

External links 
  Faculty page
  CSO Interview
  Alberto Cambrosio is a new guest professor at the CSO (2011)
 http://www.4sonline.org/prizes/fleck/ List of Ludwik Fleck Prize winners

Year of birth missing (living people)
Canadian educators
Living people
Canadian sociologists
Medical sociologists
Université de Montréal alumni
University of Basel alumni
Université de Sherbrooke alumni